Feshbach is a surname. Notable people with the surname include:

 Herman Feshbach (1917–2000), American physicist
 Jessica Feshbach (born 1975), American Scientologist
 Murray Feshbach (1929–2019), American demographer

See also
 Fischbach (surname)